The Kinshasa Industrial Water Treatment Complex  (KIWTC), is a water purification and distribution project under construction in the Democratic Republic of the Congo (DRC). Construction began in August 2021 and completion is expected in the second half of 2023. The engineering, procurement and construction (EPC) contractor is Weihai International Economic & Technical Cooperative (WIETC), of China. The project is owned and is financed by the government of DRC, with funds borrowed from the World Bank Group.

Location
The water treatment facility is located in the western suburbs of the capital city of Kinshasa, adjacent to the military base in Ngaliema, in the southwestern part of the city.

Overview
As of January 2020, the city of Kinshasa was home to an estimated population of 12 million people. Following diagnostic and feasibility studies by the Antea Group, funded by the International Development Association (IDA), the DRC officials decided to build a new water treatment complex capable of delivering  of potable water to the city on a daily basis. Under long-term planning, the city plans to expand the capacity of the complex to three times the initial size. The World Bank funded this project to the tune of US$59.4 million.

Ownership
The water treatment facility is wholly owned by the Régie de distribution d'eau (REGIDESO), the government parastatal company, responsible for provision of potable water nationwide.

Construction
The construction of the Kinshasa Industrial Water Treatment Complex is part of a larger plan called Urban Drinking Water Supply Project (Pemu). Pemu's objective is to (a) sustainably increase access to potable water in the cities of Kinshasa, Lubumbashi and Matadi  and (b) improve the efficiency of Regideso, the country's public water distribution company. Pemu will cost an estimated US$360 million to complete.

On its way from the Congo River to the new water processing facility, the intake pipe passes through Colonel Tshatshi Military Camp in the neighborhood called Ngaliema, in the western suburbs of Kinshasa.

Related new infrastructure includes the construction of a building specifically dedicated to the storage of water treatment chemicals.

See also
 Katosi Water Works

References

External links
 Official Website of Regideso

Buildings and structures in the Democratic Republic of the Congo
Kinshasa
Water resources management